Wong Ho Yin (born 12 June 1998) is a Hong Kong professional footballer who plays for Hong Kong Premier League club HK U23.

Career statistics

Club

Notes

References

External links

Living people
1998 births
Hong Kong footballers
Association football defenders
Hong Kong First Division League players
Hong Kong Premier League players
Happy Valley AA players
HK U23 Football Team players